Palliser may refer to:

People
 Anthony Palliser (born 1949), British painter
 Arthur Palliser (1890–1956), British Royal Navy admiral
 Charles Palliser (born 1947), American-born, British-based novelist
 Charles Palliser, brother of the founder of Palliser, Palliser & Company and a partner in the firm
 George Palliser (born 1919), British Royal Air Force fighter pilot
 George Palliser, founder of Palliser, Palliser & Company
 Henry Palliser (1839–1907), British Royal Navy admiral
 Hugh Palliser (1723–1796), British Royal Navy admiral and governor of Newfoundland
 John Palliser (1817–1887), Irish explorer who surveyed the Canadian west
 Michael Palliser (born 1922), former senior British diplomat
 Richard Palliser (born 1981), British chess player
 Úna Palliser, Irish-born musician
 William Palliser (1830–1882), Irish-born politician and inventor, Member of Parliament

Places

Canada
 Palliser (Alberta electoral district)
 Palliser (Saskatchewan electoral district)
 Palliser, British Columbia, an old townsite
 Palliser, Calgary, a neighbourhood in Calgary, Alberta
 Palliser Formation, a geologic formation in the Rockies
 Palliser Pass, a mountain pass in the Rockies
 Palliser Range, a mountain range of the Canadian Rockies
 Palliser Regional Park, Saskatchewan
 Palliser River, British Columbia
 Palliser Campus of the Saskatchewan Institute of Applied Science and Technology, Moose Jaw
 Palliser's Triangle, a geographic region in southern Alberta and Saskatchewan

Oceania
 Cape Palliser, a promontory on the southern coast of New Zealand's North Island
 Palliser Bay, a bay near Cape Palliser, New Zealand
 Palliser Islands, in the Tuamotu Archipelago, French Polynesia

Military
 Operation Palliser, a 2000 British military operation in Sierra Leone
 HMS Palliser (F94), an anti-submarine frigate of the British Royal Navy
 Palliser shot, a British artillery projectile

Other uses
 Fairmont Palliser Hotel, Calgary, Alberta
 Palliser baronets, a title in the baronetage of Great Britain
 Palliser expedition (1857–1860), a survey expedition in the Canadian west led by John Palliser
 Palliser Furniture, a Canadian furniture manufacturer
 Palliser Health Region, governing body for healthcare regulation in Alberta
 Palliser novels, by Anthony Trollope
 Plantagenet Palliser, one of the lead characters in Trollope's novels
 The Pallisers, a television adaptation of Trollope's novels